Year 1165 (MCLXV) was a common year starting on Friday (link will display the full calendar) of the Julian calendar.

Events 
 By place 

 Byzantine Empire 
 Spring – Emperor Manuel I (Komnenos) makes an alliance with Venice against Emperor Frederick I (Barbarossa), who takes an oath at the Diet of Würzburg to support Antipope Paschal III against Pope Alexander III.
 Andronikos Komnenos, a cousin of Manuel I, escapes from prison at Constantinople. After passing through many dangers, he reaches Kiev and seeks refuge at the court of Prince Yaroslav Osmomysl.

 Europe 
 Gerald the Fearless, Portuguese warrior and adventurer, seizes the city Évora by surprise. The same year (or soon after), he takes Cáceres, Trujillo, Montánchez, Moura, Monsaraz and Alconchel from the Almohads.
 October 15 – Battle of Fahs al-Jullab: Almoravid forces defeat Ibn Mardanish, ruler of the Taifa of Murcia. His army is routed at a place called the "merchant field" near Alhama, in the valley of the Guadalentín.
 Benjamin of Tudela, Spanish Jewish traveler, sets out on his journey from the northeast Iberian Peninsula (modern Spain), in what begins as a pilgrimage to the Holy Land.
 Otto II (the Rich), margrave of Meissen, grants Leipzig city and market privileges. The city is located at the crossways of the Via Regia and Via Imperii trade routes.

 England 
 King Owain ap Gruffydd (the Great) of Gwynedd forms an alliance with his nephew Rhys ap Gruffydd, prince of Deheubarth, to challenge English rule. They drive the English forces out of Wales.
 Battle of Crogen: King Henry II invades Wales, but is defeated and forced to retreat. After Welsh forces under Owain ap Gruffydd inflict an unknown number of casualties on the English army.
 Henry II's marriage with Queen Eleanor of Aquitaine is effectively ended when she moves back to Aquitaine. Henry begins an affair with Rosamund Clifford.
 December 9 – King Malcolm IV dies at Jedburgh after a 12-year reign and is succeeded by his brother William I (the Lion) as ruler of Scotland (until 1214).

 Asia 
 September 5 – Emperor Nijō abdicates the throne and dies after a 7-year reign. He is succeeded by his 1-year-old son Rokujō as the 79th emperor of Japan. 
 In China the Jin Dynasty (Great Jin) and the Song Dynasty make a lasting peace (until 1205).

 By topic 

 Religion 
 Eskil, Danish archbishop of Lund, appoints Fulco as the first Bishop of Estonia, marking the early beginning of the introduction of Christianity to the country. He will visit Estonia for the first time in 1169 or 1170.
 Hildegard of Bingen, German Benedictine abbess, founds Eibingen Abbey on the opposite bank of the Rhine near Rüdesheim (approximate date).
 The construction of Liuhe Pagoda (Six Harmonies Pagoda) in Hangzhou, China, is completed during the Song Dynasty.

Births 
 August 21 – Philip II, king of France (d. 1223)
 Albéric Clément, Marshal of France (d. 1191)
 Albert of Buxhoeven, bishop of Riga (d. 1229)
 Blacas III, French knight and troubadour (d. 1237)
 Conrad III, German cleric and bishop (d. 1224)
 Han (or Gongshu), Chinese empress (d. 1200)
 Henry I (the Brave), duke of Brabant (d. 1235)
 Henry VI, Holy Roman Emperor (d. 1197)
 Henry the Bearded, High Duke of Poland (d. 1238)
 Hermann von Salza, German nobleman (d. 1239)
 Ibn Arabi, Andalusian philosopher (d. 1240)
 Jean Bodel, French poet and writer (d. 1210)
 Jean de Montmirail, French nobleman (d. 1217)
 Joan of England, queen of Sicily (d. 1199)
 Phillipe de Plessis, French Grand Master (d. 1209)
 Renaud I (or Reginald), French nobleman (d. 1227)
 Ruben II (or Roupen), Armenian prince (d. 1170)
 Shizuka Gozen, Japanese court dancer (d. 1211)
 Theobald Walter, Norman High Sheriff (d. 1206)
 Waleran III (or Walram), duke of Limburg (d. 1226)
 William the Breton, French chronicler (d. 1225)

Deaths 
 January 24 – William of Ypres, Flemish nobleman (b. 1090)
 February 7 – Stephen of Armenia, Armenian nobleman (b. 1111)
 March 27 – Awn al-Din ibn Hubayra, Abbasid vizier (b. 1105)
 April 11
 Ibn al-Tilmidh, Arab physician and calligrapher (b. 1074)
 Stephen IV, king of Hungary and Croatia (b. 1133)
 September 5 – Nijō, emperor of Japan (b. 1143)
 December 9 – Malcolm IV, king of Scotland (b. 1141)
 Adalgott II of Disentis, German abbot and bishop
 Goswin of Anchin, Flemish Benedictine abbot (b. 1086)
 Gottfried of Admont, German Benedictine abbot
 Helias de Say (or Hellias), Norman nobleman
 John FitzGilbert, Marshal of England (b. 1105)
 Muhammad al-Idrisi, Arab geographer (b. 1100)
 Rostislav Glebovich, Kievan prince of Minsk
 Sibylla of Anjou, countess of Flanders (b. 1112)

References